The 1935–36 season was the 44th season of The Football League.

This season saw two significant changes in the First Division. Prior to this season Aston Villa and Blackburn Rovers had been the only ever-present members of English football's top division. Both were relegated this season to end their sequences.

First Division

Results

Maps

Second Division

Results

Maps

Third Division North

Results

Maps

Third Division South

Results

Maps

See also
1935-36 in English football
1935 in association football
1936 in association football

References

Ian Laschke: Rothmans Book of Football League Records 1888–89 to 1978–79. Macdonald and Jane's, London & Sydney, 1980.

English Football League seasons
Eng
1935–36 in English football leagues